Unduk Ngadau Kaamatan is a beauty pageant held annually during the Kaamatan cultural event in Sabah, Malaysia.

Profile
The Unduk Ngadau beauty pageant is held to commemorate the spirit of Huminodun, the mythological maiden who was of total beauty of the heart, mind and soul. The title is derived from the phrase runduk tadau which means "the girl crowned by the sunlight". Unduk Ngadau Kaamatan is one of the most recognizable cultural events in Sabah and is unique to the state. The state-level beauty pageant is the highlight and ending point of the month-long Kaamatan celebrations.

Background

The contestants of the state-level beauty pageant generally represent their district. Some districts hold joint pageants, producing more than one representative.

Beginning in 1995, Sabahans residing in Peninsular Malaysia who celebrate Kaamatan have been acknowledged by the organization. The first ever representative was Angeline Ongkunik, carrying the title Klang Valley. The first Klang Valley's representative who won the state-level crown was Daphne Iking in 2003. In the following year, Janeitha Stephen of Klang Valley was placed as the first runner-up to Tamparuli's Fharelynne Ivonne Henry. Many of the Klang Valley representatives have had their best placements in the state-level competition; 2001's Ryna Rychie James (second runner-up), 2005's Susanna James Kenson (fourth runner-up), 2007's Jaslinder Kaur (sixth runner-up), 2008's Anne Marie Tauriq Khan (sixth runner-up), 2013's Ledesma Steven (fifth runner-up), 2014's Maylesthelyn Ley Matius (sixth runner-up), 2016's Patricia Elsa Jimy (fifth runner-up), 2017's Sharlina Gilbert Mojinun (fifth runner-up) and 2019's Vinnie Alvionitta Sasising (sixth runner-up) 

Since 2014, the state of Johor in Peninsular Malaysia has been listed in the competition. The first winner for Johor was Liz Lorena Rayner who was placed as the second runner-up in the competition.

Since 2012, the question-and-answer round has been using the format by which the final contestants must answer the question in their ethnic language. Melinda Louis was one of the first to have succeeded the particular question-and-answer and eventually won.

Titleholders

List of Runners-up

Gallery Of Unduk Ngadau 

Gallery Of Unduk Ngadau

List District / Territory By Number Of Wins

References

External links
 Who is Huminodun?
  UNDUK NGADAU 1960 - 2004

Sabah
Sabah mythology
Beauty pageants in Malaysia
Malaysian awards